A header is a technique that is used in association football to control the ball using the head to pass, shoot, or clear. This can be done from a standing, jumping, or diving position. Heading is a common technique and is used by players in practically every match. Although a useful technique in football, heading carries significant health risks, particularly to the brain, and governing bodies have taken measures to address these risks.

Usage 
In general, a forward uses a header to score a goal, while a defender mostly uses a header to prevent the scoring of a goal by the opponent. When the ball is in the air, a header is often the best option because a player can’t make contact with the ball using their hands. Most header goals are scored as a result of a cross or a corner. In these situations, one attacking player passes the ball across the goal in the air, and another player (either standing, jumping or diving) strikes the ball towards the goal with their head.

During a football match, a player might head the ball six to twelve times, on average.

Footballers such as Tim Cahill, Marco van Basten, Fernando Torres, Cristiano Ronaldo, Andy Carroll, Didier Drogba, Alvaro Morata, Harry Kane, Luuk de Jong, Olivier Giroud, Gareth Bale, Javier Hernandez, Sergio Ramos, Peter Crouch, Miroslav Klose, Giorgio Chiellini, Ali Daei and Abby Wambach are some examples of players who are known for the quality of their headers.

Health concerns

Risks 
Heading the ball, whether in practice or a competitive match, carries health risks that can become apparent immediately or after a few years. Additionally, injury can occur from just one instance of heading the ball or an accumulation of repetitive headers.

The most common injury associated with heading is concussions, which account for 22% of all football injuries. Subconcussive injuries are also a concern when heading the ball. While symptoms for subconcussive injuries are not as apparent as a concussion, damage is still being dealt to the brain. In some cases, subconcussive injuries can be more severe than concussions in the long run. Chronic traumatic encephalopathy (CTE) is a subconcussive injury that is cause for concern.

A 2019 study shows that footballers, with the exclusion of goal keepers, are three and a half times more likely to suffer from neurodegenerative disease than the general population. In 2021, research had been published that shows defenders are at greater risk of developing dementia.

Incidents 
Jeff Astle, a former English professional football player, was ruled to have died from an industrial disease which was linked to heading of footballs. Former Wales professional football player, Alan Jarvis, was ruled to have died in a similar fashion.

Responses

England 
In 2020, the Football Association (FA) provided guidance that advised coaches against practicing headers in practice for children aged 11 and under. They also advised coaches to introduce light heading practice for children playing in U-12 to U-16. They even made recommendations for professional football, advising only 10 high-force headers in practice per week.

In July 2022, the FA announced they received approval from the International Football Association Board (IFAB) to trial the removal of deliberate heading in matches for those playing U-12 and under. The trial will run for the 2022-2023 season and will be coordinated with the County FA network, leagues, clubs, and schools. If successful, the FA will then apply to IFAB for a law change. If approved, deliberate heading will be banned in matches at the U-12 level and below starting in the 2023-2024 season.

USA 
In 2016, the United States Soccer Foundation implemented measures to mitigate the risks of heading the ball. The first is that children aged 10 and under cannot head the ball in practice or in games. The second limits heading for children aged 12 and 13. They are allowed to practice heading for only 30 minutes a week, and the total number of headers per player, per week cannot exceed 20. There are no restrictions on heading in a game for children aged 12 and 13.

In addition to the restrictions above, the US Soccer Federation has also updated their rules for matches. Under the new rules, if a player aged 10 and under deliberately heads a ball in a match, an indirect free kick is awarded to the opposing team. Additionally, if a player is substituted from a match due to a suspected head injury, that substitution does not count towards the team's total number of allowed substitutions.

Risk mitigation 
Although the risks of heading a football cannot be eliminated, recommendations have been made to mitigate those risks. The first is to learn the proper technique. There are ways to strike a football with the head that decreases harmful impact, such as stabilizing the neck. One can also wear headgear to reduce impact. Additionally, strengthening neck muscles can help reduce the risk of harm.

Another recommendation is to change the properties of the football being used. Studies have shown that a ball with lower air pressure and lower mass reduce acceleration and impact to the brain. While this may not be a feasible option for competitive matches, experts suggest implementing these changes to balls being used during practice.

See also
Volley
Shooting
Chip

References 

Association football skills
Association football terminology